MBC 1 is a free-to-air pan-Arab general television channel. Satellite transmission started from London in September 1991, making MBC 1 the first independent Arabic satellite TV station, with an estimated audience of more than 130 million Arab people around the world. MBC has recently moved its headquarters to Riyadh, Saudi Arabia.

MBC 1 previously used to air cartoons, western movies and programs before launching MBC 2, MBC 3, and MBC 4.

One of its most popular, widely known and controversial shows, and the one generating the highest advertising rates, is Kalam Nawaem, a show led by several women that addresses many types of (women's) issues and taboos, including terrorism, domestic violence, polygamy, divorce and women's suffrage.

MBC 1 HD launched on 1 July 2011.

From 24 March to 22 June 2020, during the COVID-19 pandemic, MBC 1 used an on-screen DOG depicting its logo encased inside a house.

Programming

Television shows and programming
Arab Idol
Good Morning Arabs
Kalam Nawaem
Little Big Stars
MBC in a Week
MBC News
Princess Sara

Play
Aleial kaburat
Bani Samet
Bay bay landan
Cocomelon
The School of the Misfits

Idents 

MBC 1 rebranded in 2012 to bring a new set of idents, idents are now 9 seconds long, unlike 2009's rebrand, which had 20 seconds long idents. In this rebrand, there are menus and bumpers (idents), the menus are used for next tags, which have continuity announcers, bumpers are used to "split" between breaks and programmes, and are used at the end of any programme. Focusing on a "cube-ish" theme, the channel has a simple look, but rather stylish.

See also
 MBC Group

References

External links
 

1991 establishments in the United Kingdom
1991 establishments in France
Television channels and stations established in 1991
Free-to-air
Television stations in Saudi Arabia
Arab mass media
Arabic-language television stations
Middle East Broadcasting Center